Kani Rash ( = , also Romanized as Kānī Rash) is a village in Baryaji Rural District, in the Central District of Sardash County, West Azerbaijan Province, Iran. At the 2006 census, its population was 148, in 27 families.

References 

Populated places in Sardasht County